Urtica urens, commonly known as annual nettle, dwarf nettle, small nettle, dog nettle, or burning nettle, is a herbaceous annual flowering plant species in the nettle family Urticaceae. It is native to Eurasia, including the Himalayan regions of Kalimpong, Darjeeling and Sikkim in India and can be found in North America, New Zealand and South Africa as an introduced species. It is reputed to sting more strongly than common nettle.

Description
Unlike the perennial and dioecious stinging nettle Urtica dioica, Urtica urens is an annual plant, monoecious (with male and female flowers on the same plant) and generally much shorter. It can be distinguished from the stinging nettle by its more rounded leaves with coarser, deeper toothing and with the terminal tooth of similar length to the adjacent teeth. The lower leaves are shorter than their longer petioles and have stinging hairs only.

Distribution
The native distribution of Urtica urens includes most of Europe except the British Isles, northern Asia, north and north-west Africa.
In the British Isles, Urtica urens is an archaeophyte, an ancient introduction. It has been introduced to all other continents of the world except Antarctica.

Organism interactions

In Europe, Urtica urens is one of the food plants of the small tortoiseshell butterfly (Aglais urticae).  In New Zealand it is also a food plant for the New Zealand red admiral butterfly (Bassaris gonerilla, syn. Vanessa gonerilla, syn. Papilio gonerilla), and the Australian / New Zealand yellow admiral butterfly (Vanessa itea).

References

External links

Jepson Manual Treatment
Photo gallery

urens
Flora of Europe
Flora of temperate Asia
Plants described in 1753
Taxa named by Carl Linnaeus